is a railway station in the city of Tochigi, Tochigi, Japan, operated by the private railway operator Tōbu Railway. The station is numbered "TN-08".

Lines

Station layout
This station consists of a single island platform serving two tracks, connected to the station building by an underground passageway.

Platforms

Adjacent stations

History
Fujioka Station opened on 1 April 1929.

From 17 March 2012, station numbering was introduced on all Tōbu lines, with Fujioka Station becoming "TN-08".

Passenger statistics
In fiscal 2019, the station was used by an average of 1631 passengers daily (boarding passengers only).

Surrounding area
 former Fujioka town hall
Fujioka Post Office

See also
 List of railway stations in Japan

References

External links

 Fujioka Station information  

Railway stations in Tochigi Prefecture
Stations of Tobu Railway
Railway stations in Japan opened in 1929
Tobu Nikko Line
Tochigi, Tochigi